In particle physics, a rho meson is a short-lived hadronic particle that is an isospin triplet whose three states are denoted as ,  and . Along with pions and omega mesons, the rho meson carries the nuclear force within the atomic nucleus.

The principal decay route of the rho mesons is to a pair of pions with a branching rate of 99.9%.

History
After several false starts, the ρ meson and the ω meson were discovered at Lawrence Berkeley Laboratory in 1961.

Composition
The rho mesons can be interpreted  as a bound state of a quark and an anti-quark and is an excited version of the pion. Unlike the pion, the rho meson has spin j = 1 (a vector meson) and a much higher value of the mass. This mass difference between the pions and rho mesons is attributed to a large hyperfine interaction between the quark and anti-quark. The main objection with the De Rujula–Georgi–Glashow description is that it attributes the lightness of the pions as an accident rather than a result of chiral symmetry breaking.

The rho mesons can be thought of as the gauge bosons of a spontaneously broken gauge symmetry whose local character is emergent (arising from QCD); Note that this broken gauge symmetry (sometimes called hidden local symmetry) is distinct from the global chiral symmetry acting on the flavors. This was described by Howard Georgi in a paper titled "The Vector Limit of Chiral Symmetry" where he ascribed much of the literature of hidden local symmetry to a non-linear sigma model.

Notes

References

Mesons
Subatomic particles with spin 1